Hypotrichia is a genus of May beetles and junebugs in the family Scarabaeidae. There is at least one described species in Hypotrichia, H. spissipes.

References

Further reading

External links

 

Melolonthinae